Shahid Rajaee Teacher Training University (SRTTU), is a public university in the Islamic Republic of Iran. The university is named for Mohammad Ali Rajaee, the second president of Iran. The university is located in the North East of Tehran, in the Lavizan neighborhood.  The university was initially founded as the Tehran American School in 1974, but was reestablished as a university in 1980.

The main mission of the Shahid Rajaee Teacher Training University is to prepare teachers to teach curriculums at technical and vocational education schools in Iran. This is a unique program among Iranian universities.

Background
Shahid Rajaee Teacher Training University (SRTTU) provides both undergraduate and graduate programs in eight faculties for typical students and teachers hired by the Ministry of Education. The education programs of typical students are separated from teacher's education programs in order to provide professional education for each group. SRTTU is a public university and therefore, the budget for education and research programs is provided by the government of Iran. Students are accepted into the university by Iranian University Entrance Exam (Konkur) which conducted by the ministry of science and technology, winning prestigious scientific awards like Khwarizmi as well as direct postgraduate programs of the ministry of science for top ranking students. SRTTU is located in the Northern part of Tehran, the capital of Iran. It has therefore the privilege of hosting some top students of provincial universities as guest and transfer students in competitive situations every year. SRTTU is one of two centers of UNEVOC-UNESCO in Iran. The Campus of SRTTU is located in Lavizan, in north east of Tehran.

SRTTU has 9 School and Faculty:

 Faculty of Electrical Engineering 
 Faculty of Civil Engineering 
 Faculty of Mechanical Engineering 
 Faculty of Metallurgy and new technology Engineering
 School of Computer Engineering 
 School of Architecture and Urban Design Engineering 
 Faculty of Science 
 Faculty of Physical science
 Faculty of Humanities

Rankings and reputation
The Shanghai Ranking ranked the Shahid Rajaee Teacher Training University 1001 among world universities in 2021. Also, The Shanghai Ranking ranked the Shahid Rajaee Teacher Training University 1201 among world universities in 2022.

Research

Journals
SRTTU has Journal of Computational and Applied Research in Mechanical Engineering (JCARME) for publishing recent research in the computational and applied mechanical engineering. Original research papers from all branches of the mechanical engineering are published in the Journal.

Journal of Technology of Education (JTE) is another Journal of SRTTU which has focused on research for increasing quality level of science and engineering education by using new technologies.

Book publishing
Publication office of Shahid Rajaee Teacher Training University (SRTTU) was established in 1998 in order to publish research books of faculties and researchers of the university.

Facilities

Equipped laboratories for engineering education

SRTTU has many equipped laboratories and workshops for teaching engineering sciences to the students. Metrology lab, machine tools workshop and CNC lab, casting workshop, welding workshops, auto mechanic lab and die designing workshop are some of the university's workshops.

Sport complex
The university has good sport facilities such as covered swimming pool, soccer place and tennis courts.

Central library
Number of books in service are about 15,000 volumes in the English and 39,039 titles in the Persian languages. Main subjects are periodicals and journals, thesis and reports, e-resources, journals for faculties of sciences, human science and physical education departments.

See also
List of universities in Iran
Wikimedia commons page

References

External links
 Shahid Rajaee Teacher Training University home page

1980 establishments in Iran
Universities in Tehran
Educational institutions established in 1980
Universities in Iran